The 1949–50 Duke Blue Devils men's basketball team represented Duke University during the 1949–50 men's college basketball season. The head coach was Gerry Gerard, coaching his eighth and final season with the Blue Devils. The team finished with an overall record of 15–15.

References 

Duke Blue Devils men's basketball seasons
Duke
1949 in sports in North Carolina
1950 in sports in North Carolina